Something Wilder is an American sitcom television series starring Gene Wilder that ran on NBC from October 1, 1994 to June 13, 1995. The series was created by Lee Kalcheim and Barnet Kellman. A total of 18 half-hour episodes were produced over one season.

Synopsis
A fifty-something husband, Gene Bergman (Wilder), and his wife, Annie (Hillary Bailey Smith), who is in her thirties, are learning to cope with raising 4-year-old fraternal twin sons, Sam and Gabe (Carl Michael Lindner and Ian Bottiglieri). Sensitive, emotional Gene was especially unprepared for the prospect of fatherhood this much later in his life, and could not fathom how the generation gap was going to play out with the kids once they grew older. Sensible Annie pulled him through all the obstacles, and in the meantime, the Bergmans were just settling in for the joy of Sam and Gabe's innocent years. Gene ran an advertising agency with his partner, crabby best friend Jack Travis (Gregory Itzin), whose offices were located adjacent to both their homes. Jack, whose kids were grown, was at first unsure about Gene's newfound habit of dropping work frequently throughout the day to play with the twins, but eventually adjusted and sometimes found himself babysitting Sam and Gabe whenever some situation (usually comedic and slapstick) caused Gene and Annie to be away. Also working for the agency was Annie's irresponsible younger brother, Richie Wainwright (Jake Weber), who doted on the kids almost as much as Gene. Others seen were Annie's niece from another of her siblings, boy crazy teen Katy Mooney (Raegan Kotz), and Caleb (Cleavant Derricks), the neighborhood handyman.

The intended wit and charm of the show was drawn from Gene Wilder's comedic intuitiveness and the frantic mimicry and mugging he put on with his two young co-stars. Wilder and on-screen wife Hillary Bailey Smith also developed a "comedic supercouple" repertoire, as they often found themselves in situations ribbed with slapstick every week, slightly reminiscent of Desi Arnaz and Lucille Ball; at the same time, they were found to depict the smart, modern career couple of the 1990s. However, Something Wilder failed to catch on with viewers, which led to cancellation by March 1995.

Cast
Gene Wilder as Gene Bergman
Hillary Bailey Smith as Annie Bergman
Carl Michael Lindner as Sam Bergman
Ian Bottiglieri as Gabe Bergman
Gregory Itzin as Jack Travis
Raegan Kotz as Katy Mooney

Guest appearances 
Alice Cooper guest starred in the 14th episode ("Hangin' With Mr. Cooper", aired March 14, 1995) when Gene unexpectedly finds himself cast in a television appearance promoting Cooper's new hit single. Cooper moving in as his neighbor was likely an attempt to heighten attention to the struggling series.

Marla Maples guest starred on the episode "Love Native American Style" that aired December 6, 1994. In this episode, Gene takes a group of children on an Indian troop camping trip. Maples plays Donna Lorenzo, a divorced mother who goes along. Together, they demonstrate wrestling techniques and share a sleeping bag.

Production 
The series premiere of Something Wilder was delayed by a few weeks in the fall of 1994, as a result of casting issues. Jennifer Grey had originally won the role of Annie Bergman, and shot the first pilot; test audiences, however, disapproved of the age difference between her and Wilder. Grey was let go, but the search for her replacement proved more challenging than expected. Almost down to the wire, NBC then cast actress Hillary Bailey Smith for the role. Smith, who was playing the contract role of Nora Gannon on One Life to Live at the time, continued appearing on that show (despite the fact that OLTL was on a competing network, ABC) during the run of Something Wilder, and resumed the daytime role full time when Something Wilder was canceled.

Episodes

Release 
After the series premiered on October 1, 1994, on Saturdays at 8/7c, lackluster ratings prompted NBC to pull the show after only four episodes had aired. It was relaunched in December in a new Tuesday 8:30/7:30c slot. The series continued steadily for another three months, but it did not do much better in the ratings. NBC dropped the show from its lineup again in March 1995, and officially canceled it not long after. One more original episode turned up in the same Tuesday time slot on June 13, 1995, with three unaired episodes remaining.

References
 Brooks, Tim and Marsh, Earle, The Complete Directory to Prime Time Network and Cable TV Shows

External links
 
 

1990s American sitcoms
1994 American television series debuts
1995 American television series endings
English-language television shows
NBC original programming
Television series about families
Television series by Warner Bros. Television Studios
Television shows set in Massachusetts